Glenea spilota is a species of beetle in the family Cerambycidae. It was described by James Thomson in 1860. It is known from Myanmar and India. It feeds on Bombax ceiba.

References

spilota
Beetles described in 1860